Notioprogonia is a suborder of the extinct mammalian order Notoungulata and includes two families, Henricosborniidae and Notostylopidae.

Notioprogonia includes the most primitive notoungulates and  has argued that Notioprogonia is paraphyletic because it would include the ancestors of the remaining suborders.  Notioprogonia is not a natural group but an assemblage of primitive notoungulates; the two families assigned here simply do not clearly belong to any other clades.

Description 
Henricosborniids such as Henricosbornia and Othnielmarshia from the late Paleocene (Itaboraian-Casamayoran SALMA) have generalized, low-crowned teeth with the dental formula  and are dentally the most primitive notoungulates, most likely located near the origin of all other notoungulates.
Simpsonotus, also from the late Paleocene and geologically the oldest notoungulate, provides us with the only known Henricoborniid skull.  It lacks an epitympanic sinus and a tympanic crest, auditory specializations that are considered synapomorphic of notoungulates, which suggests that these features evolved within notoungulates.  Simpsonotus' anterior dentition, on the other hand, is slightly odd and apparently derived, which suggest that it represents a divergent lineage.

Notostylopids such as the Casamayoran Notostylops and Boreastylops are slightly more derived than henricoborniids.  Their dentition make them superficially similar to early primate-like (non-South American) mammals such as Plesiadapis.

Arctostylopidae, a family known from the northern hemisphere, was previously included in Notioprogonia, but their resemblance to notoungulates is now believed to be convergent.   included Arctostylopidae when he first described Notioprogonia, and explained:

Classification 
 †Family Henricosborniidae
 †Henricosbornia 
 †Othnielmarshia
 †Peripantostylops
 †Simpsonotus
 †Family Notostylopidae
 †Anastylops
 †Boreastylops
 †Edvardotrouessartia
 †Homalostylops
 †Notostylops
 †Otrhonia
 †Parastylops
 Incertae sedis
 †Satshatemnus
 †Seudenius

References

Bibliography 

 
 

Notoungulates
Mammal suborders
Paleogene mammals of South America
Fossil taxa described in 1934
Taxa named by George Gaylord Simpson
Paraphyletic groups